The Glungezer is a mountain in the Tux Alps in Tyrol southeast of Innsbruck in Austria.

History

Origin of the name 
The name "Glungezer" (historical spelling also Glunggezer) probably goes back to an onomatopoeic imitation of gurgling water. In a hollow above the Tulfeinalm, but also in other places, the water flows invisibly between and under the boulders.

Aircraft accident 

On 29 February 1964, a British Eagle Bristol Britannia 312 collided with the eastern slopes of the Glungezer at a height of 2,600 metres above sea level. The aeroplane was on the approach to Innsbruck and was flying under Visual Flight Rules. However, the pilots failed to break through the clouds. All 75 passengers and eight crew members were killed. The plane that flew into the mountain triggered an avalanche that carried most of the debris 400 metres further down the mountain. Even the innkeepers of the Glungezer Hut, which was only a few hundred metres from the crash site, did not notice the crash because of the raging storm.

References

External links 

 Glungezer lifts
 Glungezer Hut, Glungezer
 Webcam on the Glungezer
 Lizumer Hut, Lizum im Wattental
 Austrian Alpine Club, Hall in Tirol section

Mountains of the Alps
Mountains of Tyrol (state)
Two-thousanders of Austria
Ski areas and resorts in Austria